In Persian cosmology, Paristan, Peristan or Pariestan ( Pariyestân, Peristân, "Land of the Peris"; also Koh-i-Qaf or Qafkuh) is the home of peris.

Muslim folklore
Although originating in pre-Islamic Persian literature, peris and Peristan were adopted in the wider Middle Eastern folklore and, through the spread of Islamic culture eastward, in the Muslim mythology of Central and South Asia. With peris being identified as a benevolent (often female ) jinn in early Quran translations into Persian, Peristan became what can be fairly compared with the fairyland/elfame of European folklore.

Mount Qaf
The alternative name Koh-i-Qaf or Qafkuh "Mount Qaf" was used by Persians both as the name of a legendary mountain and for the "strange" and unknown territory of the Caucasus Mountains which marked the extent of their knowledge and influence.

See also 
 Peri
 Fairy

References

Jinn-related places
Locations in Persian mythology